Mary Mamie O'Brien (8 July 1926 – 17 October 1998) was a feminist philosopher and professor. She taught sociology and feminist social theory in Canada until her death. She was a founding member of the Feminist Party of Canada.

Life
Mary Mamie O'Brien was born on 8 July 1926 in Walmer, Kent. Unable to take care of her children, her mother took Mary and her brother to Glasgow at the age of four, where they were raised by three aunts. According to The Women's Review of Books obituary, "Mary always said she was English by birth, Irish by name and Scottish by choice; later, she became a Canadian by choice."

After encountering the Fabian Society she was impressed by Beatrice Webb and joined the Labour Party as a teenager. She was a keen activist in the Labour Party but found her idealism shattered by the twin events of 1956: the Suez Crisis and the Soviet invasion of Hungary. However, her experience as a midwife in the industrial slums of Clydeside was to provide her with a sceptical outlook which she exhibited in her later philosophical work.

O'Brien emigrated to Canada in 1957, where she first worked as a nurse and then completed graduate work in political philosophy.

O'Brien died on 19 October 1998 in her sleep from a heart attack at the age of 72 after a long struggle with Alzheimer's disease.

The Politics of Reproduction
O'Brien wrote The Politics of Reproduction (1981), an important book in the development of feminist political theory. Starting from a Marxist materialist position, O'Brien's purpose was to connect inextricably Marx's concept of labour to produce objects to the act of giving birth, thereby placing women central in Marxist materialism as she re-defined it. Challenging the persistent denial of women's experiences in political theorizing, O'Brien proposed the relations of reproduction as essential to understanding human social and political endeavours. O'Brien's work identified the discovery of paternity as a precursor to such patriarchal institutions as marriage and sole male rights to offspring.

O'Brien's work theorizes birth, and although her arguments have at times been dismissed as essentialist, hers is rather an integration of necessary essentialism and social constructivism. She considered her main purpose in her writing and teaching to place women's experience at the centre of fundamental political discourse.

O'Brien's project extended familiar themes in feminist anthropology of the 1960s and 1970s and extends into radical sociology and anthropology of the 1980s. In the 1990s, her work was eclipsed by feminist philosophers who criticized her work as reducing women's experiences to biological determinism, thereby reducing the range of female experience to a single biological necessity. Explaining and exploring the origins of patriarchy, and offering a heuristic for the analysis of reproductive processes – "moments" – O'Brien created a conceptual framework for understanding the reproductive process: the dialectics of reproduction. She insisted on the standpoint of women, as Marx had assumed the standpoint of the proletariat. She introduced into contemporary social and political theory the expression "malestream" in reference to traditional, mainstream political and philosophical Western thought.

Technology and reproduction
In the last years of her life, in the last decade of the twentieth century, O'Brien wrote and spoke extensively about what she considered a historical moment of equal importance to the articulation of paternity: the development of reproductive technologies. She considered the developments of reproductive technologies to be revolutionary, capable in their implementations of re-configuring women's relationship to reproduction. Reliable, available, and safe contraception could allow women to separate sexual activity from reproduction; reproductive technologies such as in vitro fertilization and surrogate motherhood would allow women who are or who plan to be mothers to re-design their approaches to motherhood.  
O'Brien constructed the theoretical analysis that these reproductive technologies had to be assessed not only for their safety but also for the philosophical implications of their capacity to re-configure women's relationship to the labour of reproduction, in the same way The Politics of Reproduction declared the re-configuration of men's relationship to reproduction.  
This important theoretical analysis was cut short by O'Brien's death in 1998.

O'Brien's contributions
O'Brien left active nursing practice in 1971, but her continued analysis and writing about the politics of nursing had a profound impact on the profession, especially in Canada. She encouraged nursing professionals to take control over their working conditions and their relations to other medical practitioners, especially medical doctors. She helped to instigate a shift in how nursing professionals were educated and their resulting status in the health care field in Canada. She wrote and spoke extensively about healthcare and health care reform in Canada, with particular attention to the role and status of nurses.

O'Brien's lasting contribution to feminist political theory is her analysis of the dialectical structure of reproductive consciousness. The physical labour, literally, involved in women's reproductive experiences must be accounted, both as actual material production but also, more importantly, central to a sense of connection and integration of human endeavour. O'Brien also asserted the ownership over the means of production ought to be extended to women's rights to maintain authority and control over their children.

References

Sources
Mary O'Brien, The politics of reproduction (Routledge and Kegan Paul, 1981).
Mary O'Brien, Reproducing the world: Essays in feminist theory (Westview Press, 1989).

External links

Mary Mamie O'Brien fonds at the University of Toronto Archives

1926 births
1998 deaths
20th-century Canadian philosophers
20th-century Canadian women writers
20th-century LGBT people
Canadian feminists
Canadian philosophers
Canadian political philosophers
Canadian women philosophers
Feminist philosophers
Scottish women philosophers
Scottish philosophers